Mara Elizabeth Wilson (born July 24, 1987) is an American actress and writer. She rose to prominence as a child for playing Natalie Hillard in the film Mrs. Doubtfire (1993) and went on to play Susan Walker in Miracle on 34th Street (1994), the title character in Matilda (1996), Annabel Greening in A Simple Wish (1997), and Lily Stone in Thomas and the Magic Railroad (2000). Wilson took a 12-year hiatus following the last film to focus on writing. She returned to acting in 2012, and has predominantly worked in web series.

Early life
Mara Elizabeth Wilson was born in Burbank, California, on July 24, 1987, the oldest daughter of Burbank PTA school volunteer Suzie Wilson (née Shapiro; 1953–1996) and KTLA broadcast engineer Mike Wilson. Her mother was Jewish, while her father is half Irish. She was raised Jewish and became an atheist when she was 15. She has three older brothers named Danny, Jon, and Joel, and a younger sister named Anna. She is a cousin of political commentator and media host Ben Shapiro. She has disavowed him due to differences arising from his conservative views and her opposing progressive beliefs. They have no contact with each other.

Wilson's mother was diagnosed with breast cancer on March 10, 1995, and died on April 26, 1996. The film Matilda was dedicated to her memory. Wilson later recalled that this affected her passion for acting. At age 12, Wilson was diagnosed with obsessive–compulsive disorder. She has also been diagnosed with attention deficit hyperactivity disorder. She attended Idyllwild Arts Academy in Idyllwild, California. After graduation in 2005, she relocated to New York City to continue her studies at New York University's Tisch School of the Arts, graduating in 2009. She appeared in her own one-woman show called Weren't You That Girl? while in college.

Career

When Wilson was five, she became interested in acting after watching her older brother Danny appear in television commercials. Her parents were initially disinclined, but eventually appearing in several commercials for businesses, she was invited to audition for the 1993 comedy film Mrs. Doubtfire. Producers were impressed and awarded her the role of Natalie Hillard. The following year, she appeared in the remake of Miracle on 34th Street.

In 1994, Wilson was cast in a recurring role as Nikki Petrova on Melrose Place and played Barbara Barton in the television film A Time to Heal. She sang "Make 'Em Laugh" at the 67th Academy Awards broadcast on March 27, 1995, with Tim Curry and Kathy Najimy. In 1995, she won the ShoWest Award for Young Star of the Year.

Wilson's film work caught the attention of Danny DeVito, and she was cast as the main protagonist Matilda Wormwood in the 1996 film Matilda. She was nominated for three awards for her performance, winning the YoungStar Award for Best Performance by a Young Actress in a Comedy Film. In 1997, she starred in A Simple Wish alongside Martin Short. Although Wilson was nominated for three awards, the film mostly received negative reviews by critics.

In 1997, Wilson went to a table reading for What Dreams May Come starring Robin Williams, but she did not get the part. A year later, she unsuccessfully auditioned for the 1998 remake of Disney's The Parent Trap but the role was given to Lindsay Lohan after Wilson was deemed too young. In 1999, she portrayed Willow Johnson in the film for The Wonderful World of Disney titled Balloon Farm, based on a fiction book.

In 2000, Wilson appeared in the fantasy film Thomas and the Magic Railroad, which was her last film. The film was universally panned by critics and performed poorly at the box office. She retired from film work shortly afterward. She received a script for the 2001 film Donnie Darko, but declined to audition for the film. After retiring from film acting, she began stage acting. Her theater credits include A Midsummer Night's Dream and Cinderella. She starred in her own live shows Weren't You That Girl? and What Are You Afraid Of?

In 2012, Wilson appeared briefly in one episode of a web series called Missed Connection in the role of Bitty and made special appearances on internet review shows for That Guy with the Glasses—most notably a comedic turn playing an adult Matilda during a review of Matilda by The Nostalgia Chick, Lindsay Ellis. That year, she explained why she quit film acting: "Film acting is not very fun. Doing the same thing over and over again until, in the director's eyes, you 'get it right', does not allow for very much creative freedom. The best times I had on film sets were the times the director let me express myself, but those were rare."

In May 2013, Wilson wrote an article for Cracked.com, offering her opinion of the delinquency of some former child stars. As of 2013, she worked for Publicolor. Her play Sheeple was produced in 2013 for the New York International Fringe Festival. In an interview that December, Wilson stated that her film acting days are over, and that she is instead focusing on writing. Her book Where Am I Now?: True Stories of Girlhood and Accidental Fame was published on September 13, 2016.

Wilson has a recurring role on the podcast Welcome to Night Vale as "The Faceless Old Woman Who Secretly Lives in Your Home", as well as her own storytelling show called What Are You Afraid Of? In 2016, she made a brief return to television in a Mrs. Doubtfire-inspired episode of Broad City, in which she played a waitress where the comical Heimlich scene from the film was re-enacted. That same year, she voiced Jill Pill, a writer/director anthropomorphic spider, in season 3 of BoJack Horseman. She voiced Liv Amara/Diane "Di" Amara in Big Hero 6: The Series.

In a 2017 NPR interview, The Simpsons voice actor Nancy Cartwright stated that a young Wilson was the inspiration for a character's voice on the episode "Bart Sells His Soul".

Charity work
In 2015, Wilson collaborated with Project UROK, a nonprofit organization whose mission is to aid teens with mental illness.

Personal life
As of 2013, Wilson resides in the Queens borough of New York City. She came out as bisexual during an interview with Medium in September 2017.

In 2015, Wilson appeared in a video by the mental health charity Project UROK in which she discussed the mental illnesses she has experienced, including anxiety, depression, and obsessive compulsive disorder. She discussed her history of mental illness on Paul Gilmartin's podcast The Mental Illness Happy Hour.

In a 2017 op-ed in Elle magazine, Wilson defended 13-year-old actress Millie Bobby Brown after commentators sexualized Brown's public image. In a 2021 op-ed in The New York Times, she commented on the documentary Framing Britney Spears and the parallels between their lives as child stars. She recalled an incident in which she was asked to comment on the burgeoning sexuality of an 18-year-old Spears when she herself was barely 13, and expressed relief at largely escaping oversexualization of her public image compared to Spears. She described her disappointment when a reporter called her a "spoiled brat" after she stated that she wanted the day off on her 13th birthday instead of granting interviews. She apologized for sounding like a "spoiled brat".

Filmography

Screen roles

Film

Television

Web

Stage roles 
A Midsummer Night's Dream (2004)
 Cinderella (2005)
 Weren't You That Girl? (2009)
 What Are You Afraid Of? (2014)

Bibliography
 Sheeple (Play, 2013)
 Where Am I Now?: True Stories of Girlhood and Accidental Fame (2016)

Awards and nominations

References

External links
 Mara Wilson at Substack
 
 Mara Wilson on Instagram
 

1987 births
Living people
20th-century American actresses
Actresses from Los Angeles
Jewish American atheists
American child actresses
American voice actresses
American stage actresses
American people of Irish descent
American women podcasters
American podcasters
American film actresses
American television actresses
American soap opera actresses
American women bloggers
American bloggers
American women writers
American LGBT dramatists and playwrights
Bisexual actresses
Jewish American actresses
Jewish American dramatists and playwrights
Jewish women writers
Bisexual dramatists and playwrights
Bisexual Jews
LGBT people from California
People with obsessive–compulsive disorder
Singers from Los Angeles
Tisch School of the Arts alumni
Writers from Los Angeles
21st-century American actresses
21st-century American women writers
People from Burbank, California
American bisexual actors
American bisexual writers